Yumin Township is a township under the administration of Yushu, Jilin, China. , it has 12 villages under its administration.

References 

Township-level divisions of Jilin
Yushu, Jilin